Friedrich Anton Wilhelm Miquel (24 October 1811 – 23 January 1871) was a Dutch botanist, whose main focus of study was on the flora of the Dutch East Indies.

Early life
Miquel was born in Neuenhaus and studied medicine at the University of Groningen, where, in 1833, he received his doctorate.  After starting work as a doctor at the Buitengasthuis Hospital in Amsterdam, in 1835, he taught medicine at the clinical school in Rotterdam. In 1838 he became correspondent of the Royal Institute, which later became the Royal Netherlands Academy of Arts and Sciences, and in 1846 he became member. He was professor of botany at the University of Amsterdam (1846–1859) and Utrecht University (1859–1871). He directed the Rijksherbarium (National Herbarium) at Leiden from 1862. In 1866, he was elected a foreign member of the Royal Swedish Academy of Sciences.

Research
Miquel did research on the  taxonomy of plants. He was interested in the flora of the Dutch Empire, specifically the Dutch East Indies and Suriname.  Although he never traveled far, he knew through correspondence a large collection of  Australian and Indian plants.  He described many species and genera in important families like Casuarinaceae, Myrtaceae, Piperaceae and Polygonaceae. In total, he has published some 7,000 botanical names. Through his partnership with the German botanist Heinrich Göppert, he became interested in paleobotany, the study of fossil plants, notably the fossil Cycads. Along with Jacob Gijsbertus Samuël van Breda, Pieter Harting and Winand Staring, he was in the first commission to create a geological map of the Netherlands, which was published in 1852 by  Johan Rudolph Thorbecke.

Legacy
Miquel died in Utrecht at the age of 59 in 1871, after which he was succeeded as the director of the National Herbarium by Willem Frederik Reinier Suringar.  From his estate, the Miquel fund was established, which provides financial support to botanists at the University of Utrecht. The former home of the director of the botanical gardens in the city center of Utrecht is called "Miquel's House". In the Laakkwartier district of the Hague is a street named after him.

He is honoured in the naming of two forms of plant taxa;
In 1838, botanist Carl Meissner published Miquelia, which is a genus in the flowering plants in the family Icacinaceae. They are found in tropical India, Southeast Asia, and the Philippines. Then in 1980, botanist Fric ex F.Ritter published Miqueliopuntia, which is a genus of cactus from South America.

Key publications
 Genera Cactearum, Rotterdam, 1839
 Monographia Cycadearum, Utrecht, 1842
 Systema Piperacearum, Rotterdam, 1843-1844
 Illustrationes Piperacearum, Bonn, 1847
 Cycadeae quaedam Americanae, partim novae. Amsterdam, 1851.
 Flora Indiae batavae, Amsterdam, 1855-1859
 Leerboek der Artensij-Gewassen, Utrecht, 1859
 De Palmis Archipelagi Indici observationes novae. Amsterdam, 1868.

References

External links 

 
 
 
 

19th-century Dutch botanists
1811 births
1871 deaths
Botanists with author abbreviations
Members of the Royal Netherlands Academy of Arts and Sciences
Members of the Royal Swedish Academy of Sciences
People from Bentheim